Leslie Lewis is the name of

 Leslie Lewis (sprinter) (1924–1986), British sprinter
 Leslie Lewis (marathon runner) (born 1955), American marathon runner

See also
 Lesle Lewis (disambiguation)